Kenneth Quinn (born 30 May 1971) is an Antiguan cricketer. He played in nineteen first-class and four List A matches for Colombo Cricket Club and the Leeward Islands from 1993 to 1999.

See also
 List of Leeward Islands first-class cricketers

References

External links
 

1971 births
Living people
Antigua and Barbuda cricketers
Colombo Cricket Club cricketers
Leeward Islands cricketers